Ina Ananieva is a former Bulgarian gymnast and rhythmic gymnastics coach.

Biography
In 1991, Ananieva won a silver medal as part of the Bulgarian team at the World Championships in Athens, Greece. In 2012, she was appointed as head coach of the Bulgarian rhythmic gymnasts. In 2014, Ananieva became the coach of the year in Bulgarian sports after the Bulgarian women won gold in the group all-around at the 2014 World Championships.

References

1977 births
Living people
Bulgarian rhythmic gymnasts
Place of birth missing (living people)